solidThinking is a software company developing Evolve, a 3D modeling and rendering software and Inspire, a concept generation tool.

History 

Brothers Alex Mazzardo and Mario Mazzardo started the solidThinking project in 1991 with Guido Quaroni, today Vice President of Software R&D at Pixar Animation Studios. The design software was originally developed for NEXTSTEP, the operating system developed by NeXT, and it was soon awarded as the best new application in the "CAD and 3D" category at NeXTWORLD EXPO held in San Francisco in June 1993. 

A complete re-write of the application for the Windows platform was completed in 1998 with the release of solidThinking 3.0 for Windows. The Construction History and an extensive NURBS modeling toolset were the main additions. One year later solidThinking for Mac OS X was also released. Today all releases of solidThinking are simultaneously developed for both Windows and Mac OS X.

solidThinking version 8.0 and solidThinking Inspired 8.0, introducing the morphogenesis form-generation technology, were released in September 2009.

With the 9.0 release, solidThinking became Evolve and solidThinking Inspired became Inspire, both sold under the solidThinking brand.

References

External links
 Official site

Computer-aided design software
3D graphics software